AlloCiné TV was a private thematic TV channel, launched by the website AlloCiné on September 5, 2011. It offered magazines and documentaries regarding cinema topics. It also broadcast movies of different categories in the evening.

History
On September 5, 2011, AlloCiné TV was launched via the cable and satellite networks of Orange, Free and Bouygues Telecom, as of September 20, 2011 on CanalSat and Numericable and as of October 4, 2011 via the SFR network. AllCciné TV was a cinema-based channel, free and independent of other channels. It offered 24 hours a day issues and reports behind the scenes of the 7th Art. It was also announced to broadcast of 190 films and 1 hour of live broadcasting every night. The channel was financed by advertising. All of its programs were produced by its subsidiary AlloCiné Productions.

On October 18, 2011, AlloCiné TV announced that it was a candidate for a TNT frequency for which the Conseil supérieur de l'audiovisuel (CSA) had issued a call for tenders. On January 9, 2012, the channel renounced to apply for the call for candidatures of the CSA and indicated that it will continue to emit via cable and satellite networks.

On April 15, 2012, AlloCiné's US shareholder decided to close AlloCiné TV after less than a year of broadcasting.

Programming

Carnets de voyage
Direct To DVD
Escale à Nanarland
Game in Ciné
Hollywood Boulevard
La Minute
La Grande Séance
Le son de cinéma
Ma scène préférée
Merci qui?
Plein 2 ciné
Soirée Serials
Tout un programme
Tueurs en séries

References

External links
 

Defunct television channels in France
Television channels and stations established in 2011
Television channels and stations disestablished in 2012
2011 establishments in France
2012 disestablishments in France
Mass media in Paris
French-language television stations